EdVisions is a nonprofit organization that works with charter schools, school districts and community groups to create and sustain small schools using self-directed project-based learning, small learning communities and authentic assessment.  The EdVisions headquarters is located in Saint Paul, Minnesota.

Non-profit organizations based in Minnesota